Cowan-Dickie is a surname. Notable people with the surname include:

 Luke Cowan-Dickie (born 1993), English rugby union player
 Tom Cowan-Dickie (born 1991), English rugby union player, brother of Luke

Compound surnames